Mamadou Konate (1897 in Kati, Mali - May 11, 1956 in Bamako) was a politician from Mali who served in the French National Assembly from 1946-1956. The 10,000-capacity Stade Mamadou Konaté, a football stadium in Bamako, is named after him.

References 

 1st page on the French National Assembly website  
 2nd page on the French National Assembly website

1897 births
1956 deaths
People from Koulikoro Region
People of French West Africa
Malian politicians
Union progressiste politicians
Rassemblement Démocratique Africain politicians
Deputies of the 1st National Assembly of the French Fourth Republic
Deputies of the 2nd National Assembly of the French Fourth Republic
Deputies of the 3rd National Assembly of the French Fourth Republic